Cadet College Fateh Jang is a boys cadet college in Fateh Jang, Punjab, Pakistan that was established in 2001.

The cadet college offers its students a choice of streams, offering both a Pakistani stream to higher education as well as GCE O level and A level qualifications along with ISSB training for recruitment in the armed forces of Pakistan. Spread over an area of more than 220 kanals, there are six houses in the college served by numerous facilities, including one mess hall, one auditorium, three hostel blocks, two academic blocks, one mosque, one swimming pool, various sports facilities, one cafeteria, and one medical unit. It has the capacity to accommodate 350 cadets. Cadet College Fateh Jang along with other renowned colleges such as Aitchison College, Roots International Schools and Colleges, Government Higher School, Sadiq Public School Bahawalpur etc. are one of the prestigious institutes in Pakistan providing quality education.

Infrastructure
Situated on the Islamabad Fateh Jang Civil Hospital Road, Near Power Plant, Bhal Syedan, Fateh Jang, the college is spread over an area of 200 canal. The National Flag fluttering on the College Parade ground is emblematic of its glory and high ideals. After the two-storey administrative block I and academic block II are six boarding wings, Ayubi House, Ghazali House, Roomi House, Jinnah House, Sir Syed House and Nishter House. An artistically built auditorium is used for social functions. The auditorium accommodates cadets for all types of social functions, i.e. Movie Night, Debate Contests, Mushaira and Exam Hall etc. There is a spacious cadet mess and indoor sports complex with multiple indoor games like table tennis, badminton, basketball, board games etc. The academic block is equipped with white boards, overhead projectors, flip charts and other audio visual aids to create a conducive environment for learning. A Computer laboratory, Library, science laboratories and mosque is also built for cadets inside the campus. Evening finds the cadets sporting at the numerous playgrounds having grounds and Stadium having capacity of 2000 people for cricket, football etc. & a swimming pool.

Board of Governor
The Governing body of the Cadet College consists of senior military officers, renowned educationists and the elite of society.
The college staff greatly benefits from the guidance provided by these eminent personalities as laid down in the rules and procedures.
The Principal answers to the Board of Governors.

Houses
To efficiently manage the system, the cadet college is divided into six administrative wings/houses to provide independent hostels and playground facilities to the cadets.

References

External links
 
 Parhlo
 Official Facebook page
 Glassdoor
 Ilm Ki Dunya
 Google Map

Schools in Punjab, Pakistan
Cadet colleges in Pakistan
Boarding schools in Pakistan
Cadet colleges